Oneeka Williams (born March 2, 1966) is a urologic surgeon, writer, and children's book author known for her book series Dr. Dee Dee Dynamo. She currently works at Emerson Hospital's Urology department and is a Clinical Assistant Professor of Urology at Tufts University School of Medicine.

Early life 
Oneeka Williams was born in Guyana. Then, early on in life she moved to Barbados where her mother worked as a science teacher and her father worked as a journalist.

Career

Medical career 
She graduated from Johns Hopkins University with a BA in biophysics, Harvard Medical School with an MD, and Harvard T.H. Chan School of Public Health with a MPH. Oneeka Williams completed her surgical internship at Massachusetts General Hospital in Boston, MA, and her residency at Lahey Clinic in Burlington, MA. Oneeka Williams is currently working as a urologic surgeon in Concord, MA at Emerson Urology.

Writing career 
Williams is founder and CEO of Dr. Dee Dee Dynamo, LLC located in Newtonville, Massachusetts.

Williams has published seven books. These include five books for the Dr. Dee Dee Dynamo series, an autobiography, and one book in her new series "Not Even the Sky is the Limit."

Publications

Dr. Dee Dee Dynamo's Series 

 Dr. Dee Dee Dynamo's Mission to Pluto  (March 5, 2013)
Dr. Dee Dee Dynamo's Saturn Surprise  (February 3, 2015)
Dr. Dee Dee Dynamo's Bee More Breakthru Coloring & Activity Book  (October 4, 2016)
Dr. Dee Dee Dynamo's Vineyard Vacation  (January 1, 2018)
Dr. Dee Dee Dynamo's Ice Worm Intervention  (April 5, 2018)

Not Even the Sky is the Limit Series 

 My Joy Tank  (January 1, 2019)

Independent books 

 Not Today, Negativity!: 5 Habits of Positivity to Cope, Hope, and Be Well in Tough Times  (August 17, 2021)

See also 

 Urology
 Health in Guyana

References 

Wikipedia Student Program
Guyanese medical doctors
21st-century Guyanese writers
Guyanese women writers
Tufts University School of Medicine faculty
Living people
Johns Hopkins University alumni
Harvard Medical School alumni
Harvard School of Public Health alumni
1966 births